Sun Minghui (born April 26, 1996) is a Chinese basketball player who plays in the guard position for China and currently plays for Chinese club Zhejiang Lions. 

He was included in the Chinese squad for the 2019 FIBA Basketball World Cup.

Later, he was included in China's squad for the 2023 FIBA Basketball World Cup qualification.

References 

1996 births
Living people
2019 FIBA Basketball World Cup players
Asian Games gold medalists for China
Asian Games medalists in basketball
Basketball players at the 2018 Asian Games
Chinese men's basketball players
Medalists at the 2018 Asian Games
Point guards